Špišić Bukovica is a municipality in Croatia in the Virovitica–Podravina County.

Demographics
It has a total population of 4,221 (2011 census), in the following settlements:
 Bušetina, population 815
 Lozan, population 440
 Novi Antunovac, population 101
 Okrugljača, population 272
 Rogovac, population 228
 Špišić Bukovica, population 1,686
 Vukosavljevica, population 679

98.5% of the population are Croats, per census 2001.

History
In the late 19th century and early 20th century, Špišić Bukovica was part of the Virovitica County of the Kingdom of Croatia-Slavonia.

References

Populated places in Virovitica-Podravina County
Municipalities of Croatia